Pardesiya is a town in the Central District of Israel. Located on the Sharon plain, between Kfar Yona and the Lev HaSharon Regional Council, it was founded between 1937 and 1939.

History

Before the 20th century, Pardesiya (from Arabic, Ghabet Fardisya) formed part of the Forest of Sharon, a hallmark of the region’s historical landscape. It was an open woodland dominated by Mount Tabor Oak (Quercus ithaburensis), which extended from Kfar Yona in the north to Ra’ananna in the south. The local Arab inhabitants traditionally used the area for pasture, firewood and intermittent cultivation. The intensification of settlement and agriculture in the coastal plain during the 19th century led to deforestation and subsequent environmental degradation known from Hebrew sources.

The lands of Pardesiya were purchased in 1928 by Jean-Yona Fisher, but remained unused. In 1937 Avraham Tabib of the Yemenite olim organization asked its members to come to the land to build a village, promising cheap land. Twenty families came and in 1939 completed the construction. During World War II, the villagers found themselves unemployed and unable to pay taxes for their housing. The residents managed to settle the issue with the Jewish Agency for Israel and continued living in the village. After the war, a new neighborhood was built, as well as a ma'abara to absorb new immigrants. Pardesiya gained local council status in 1952.

Geography and location
Pardesiya is located on the Sharon plain, bordering Kfar Yona on the east and Tzur Moshe of the Lev HaSharon Regional Council. Highway 4 borders the town to the west, and Road 5613 to the south. Its elevation is 35 m above sea level.

Demographics
As of 2008, Pardesiya settles 6,318 residents. 99.5% Jewish, with an additional 0.5% being other non-Arabs. The age distribution was as follows:

International relations
Pardesiya's twin cities:
Viersen, Germany

Notable residents 

David Tiram, footballer

References

External links

Central District (Israel)
Local councils in Central District (Israel)
Populated places established in 1938
1938 establishments in Mandatory Palestine